Estonia competed at the 2014 Winter Olympics in Sochi, Russia from 7 to 23 February 2014. On 24 January 2014, 25 athletes were officially named to the Estonian Olympic team.

Alpine skiing 

According to the quota allocation released on January 20, 2014, Estonia had two athletes in qualification position.

Biathlon 

Based on their performance at the 2012 and 2013 Biathlon World Championships Estonia qualified 5 men and 4 women.

Men

Women

Mixed

Cross-country skiing

According to the quota allocation released on January 20, 2014, Estonia had five athletes in qualification position and received two more places as next eligible in the waiting list.

Distance
Men

Women

Sprint

Figure skating 

Estonia had achieved the following quota places.

Nordic combined 

According to the quota allocation released on January 20, 2014, Estonia had four athletes in qualification position.

Ski jumping 

Estonia qualified two athletes.

References

External links 
 
 

Nations at the 2014 Winter Olympics
2014
Winter Olympics